"OctaHate" is the debut single by Ryn Weaver, taken from her Promises EP as well as debut album, The Fool. It was released by Interscope and Friends Keep Secrets Records on August 8, 2014. The song's lyrics, which do not contain the title, were written by Weaver and fellow musician Charli XCX, while music and production were handled by Benny Blanco, Michael Angelakos of Passion Pit and Norwegian electronic musician Cashmere Cat.

Music video
The original music video for "OctaHate" was taken down, and replaced by a new one on May 14, 2015. During an interview with New York magazine, Weaver talked about why she took down the original. She claims the video was made on a small budget and wasn't executed properly so she chose to create a new one because she "wanted people to understand [her] cohesive vision." The new music video for "OctaHate" was inspired by the 1966 film Daisies by director Věra Chytilová. Weaver explained, "For the second one, we ripped a page from this '60s Czech film called Daisies—this feminist, absurdist piece. In this scene, they talk about how the whole world is spoiled and how as a result, they should spoil themselves," a theme which can be seen mirrored in the music video.

Live performances
Ryn made her live TV debut with OctaHate on the Late Show with David Letterman on January 15, 2015.

Critical reception
Chris Deville from Stereogum praised the song saying, "Even at a time when it seems like every upstart on SoundCloud is pushing sparkly pan-genre synthpop, 'OctaHate' stood out for its sleek exterior and the effortless manner in which it swung from playful sway to magnificent sweep." The song was also given a positive review by Michelle Geslani of Consequence of Sound saying, "'OctaHate' is as catchy as a pop number can possibly hope to be. Between the twinkling xylophones, airtight melodies, and frothy beats, Weaver already sounds radio-ready, just in time for summer."

Charts

Certifications

References

External links

2014 songs
2014 debut singles
Interscope Records singles
American pop songs
Songs written by Charli XCX
Songs written by Cashmere Cat
Songs written by Benny Blanco
Song recordings produced by Benny Blanco
Song recordings produced by Cashmere Cat
Songs written by Ryn Weaver